Raoping Hakka (Taiwanese Hakka Romanization System: ngiau pin kagˋ gaˇ faˋ), also known as Shangrao Hakka, is a dialect of Hakka Chinese spoken in Raoping, Guangdong, as well as Taiwan.

Distribution
In Raoping County, Hakka is spoken in the north, including the towns of Shangshan, Shangrao, Raoyang, Jiucun, Jianrao, and Xinfeng, as well as some villages in Hanjiang Forest Farm. As of 2005, there are 190,000 Hakka speakers in Raoping County (19% of the county's population).

The distribution of Raoping Hakka in Taiwan is scattered. It is mainly spoken in Taoyuan City (Zhongli, Pingzhen, Xinwu, Guanyin, Bade), Hsinchu County (Zhubei, Qionglin), Miaoli County (Zhuolan), and Taichung City (Dongshi). In 2013, only 1.6% of Hakka people in Taiwan were reported to be able to communicate in the Raoping dialect.

Contact with surrounding varieties
Raoping Hakka has some phonological and lexical features that appear to come from contact with Teochew. Some nasalized vowels come from Teochew, such as  'nose'  (Teochew ),  'to like'  (Teochew ). There is also many shared lexical items with Teochew:

In Taiwan, Raoping Hakka is in contact with other varieties of Hakka, notably Sixian and Hailu dialects. There are some phonological and morphological features that appear to originate in these surrounding varieties. For example, in Taoyuan near Sixian-speaking areas, the diminutive suffix is pronounced  as it is pronounced in Sixian, while in Hailu-dominant Hsinchu, the suffix is pronounced as the Hailu .

See also
 Taiwanese Hakka

Notes

References
 
 
 
 
 

Hakka Chinese
Languages of Taiwan